Grant is a city in Montgomery County, Iowa, United States. The population was 86 at the time of the 2020 census.

History
Grant is named for Ulysses S. Grant, 18th President of the United States.  Its commercial district, which was developed from 1871 to 1952, was listed on the National Register of Historic Places in 2002.

Geography
Grant is located at  (41.142207, -94.985369).

Demographics

2010 census
As of the census of 2010, there were 92 people, 41 households, and 27 families living in the city. The racial makeup of the city was 100.0% White.

There were 41 households, of which 17.1% had children under the age of 18 living with them, 58.5% were married couples living together, 7.3% had a female householder with no husband present, and 34.1% were non-families. 19.5% of all households were made up of individuals, and 7.3% had someone living alone who was 65 years of age or older. The average household size was 2.24 and the average family size was 2.59.

The median age in the city was 52 years. 13% of residents were under the age of 18; 4.4% were between the ages of 18 and 24; 21.8% were from 25 to 44; 35.9% were from 45 to 64; and 25% were 65 years of age or older. The gender makeup of the city was 50.0% male and 50.0% female.

2000 census
As of the census of 2000, there were 102 people, 46 households, and 32 families living in the city. The racial makeup of the city was 97.06% White, 0.98% African American, 0.98% Native American, and 0.98% from two or more races.

There were 46 households, out of which 21.7% had children under the age of 18 living with them, 63.0% were married couples living together, 4.3% had a female householder with no husband present, and 30.4% were non-families. 30.4% of all households were made up of individuals, and 17.4% had someone living alone who was 65 years of age or older. The average household size was 2.22 and the average family size was 2.69.

In the city, the population was spread out, with 17.6% under the age of 18, 5.9% from 18 to 24, 26.5% from 25 to 44, 29.4% from 45 to 64, and 20.6% who were 65 years of age or older. The median age was 44 years. For every 100 females, there were 108.2 males. For every 100 females age 18 and over, there were 100.0 males.

The median income for a household in the city was $21,806, and the median income for a family was $42,917. Males had a median income of $20,625 versus $36,250 for females. The per capita income for the city was $16,461. There were no families and 10.8% of the population living below the poverty line, including no under eighteens and none of those over 64.

Education
The Griswold Community School District operates area public schools.

References

Cities in Iowa
Cities in Montgomery County, Iowa